Salcedo is a canton in the Cotopaxi Province, Ecuador. in 2014 it had a population of 70,000. The capital of the canton is San Miguel de Salcedo.

Salcedo is famous for its ice cream.
Salecdo is a canton that has 6 parroquias Cusubamba, Santa Lucia, Mulalillo, Mulliquindil,   
Panzaleo and the main parroquia is San Miguel the canton is 484 sq kilometers 300 sq miles the canton is in southern Cotopaxi province.

Demographics 
Ethnic groups as of the Ecuadorian census of 2010:
Mestizo  68.6%
Indigenous  27.9%
White  2.0%
Afro-Ecuadorian  1.1%
Montubio  0.4%
Other  0.0%

References 

 www.inec.gov.ec

External links 
 Map of the Cotopaxi Province
 www.ame.gov.ec

Cantons of Cotopaxi Province